Diamond Multimedia is an American company that specializes in many forms of multimedia technology. They have produced graphics cards, motherboards, modems, sound cards and MP3 players, however the company began with the production of the TrackStar, a PC add-on card which emulated Apple II computers. They were one of the major players in the 2D and early 3D graphics card competition throughout the 1990s and early 2000s.

Diamond Multimedia is a subsidiary of Tul Corporation.

History 
The company was founded by Chong Moon Lee and H. H. Huh, who acted as the technical designer. Diamond Multimedia later merged with S3, Incorporated in 1999 after a long-time cooperative business arrangement, when S3 decided to expand their business from producing graphics chipsets to manufacturing retail graphics cards. The move paralleled the 1999 3dfx purchase of STB Systems, which changed 3dfx from a graphics chipset supplier to companies including Diamond, into a vertically-integrated graphics vendor and direct competitor to S3. However, the first major product after the merger, branded as the S3 Savage 2000, was a commercial failure. Growth in the add-on sound card market, also an ongoing Diamond business, was tempered by the 2000 bankruptcy of Aureal Semiconductor and subsequent asset purchase by vertically-integrated Creative Technologies.

With these market failures, the new combined Diamond/S3 company decided to change direction and leave the PC addon-board market. SONICblue was formed. Diamond Multimedia resurfaced in 2003 after the brand and assets had been purchased by Best Data. Diamond again built expansion boards.

The company was the defendant in a significant copyright case for its Rio digital music player, which the Recording Industry Association of America claimed infringed copyrights; the Ninth Circuit deemed it to be a fair use, however, in RIAA v. Diamond.

Graphics cards

Speedstar
Diamond's earliest line, now defunct, was the SpeedStar series, initially based on the Tseng Labs ET4000AX chipset, and expanded further in additional releases. The SpeedStar line was launched as a series of high-performance ISA graphics cards that excelled in MS-DOS applications up through the early 1990s. However, as Microsoft Windows gained market share and newer graphics products entered the market, it was later relegated to the cheaper, value-oriented products and the SpeedStar branding was expanded to other products.

Partial listing of Speedstar-branded models
Diamond SpeedStar Tseng Labs ET4000AX 	 ISA - Older model, doesn't support true color
Diamond SpeedStar 24 Tseng Labs ET4000AX 	ISA - Newer model with the same chipset but different DAC, supports true color
Diamond SpeedStar 24X 	WD90C31 	ISA
Diamond SpeedStar Pro 	Cirrus Logic CL-GD5426/5428 	ISA/VLB
Diamond SpeedStar 64 	Cirrus Logic CL-GD5434 	ISA/PCI
Diamond SpeedStar Pro SE 	Cirrus Logic CL-GD5430 	VLB/PCI
Diamond SpeedStar SuperVGA 	Tseng Labs ET4000 	ISA
Diamond SpeedStar A50 SiS 6326 AGP
Diamond SpeedStar A55 S3 Trio3D AGP
Diamond SpeedStar A70 SiS 6326 AGP
Diamond SpeedStar A90 S3 Savage4 AGP
Diamond SpeedStar A200 S3 Savage4 AGP

Stealth

The Stealth cards of the 2D era were first launched in the early 1990s and were usually based on GUI accelerators from S3 Graphics. The line later included chipsets with combined 2D and 3D capabilities. Initially the Stealth line was Diamond's high-end brand but transitioned to midrange after the Viper line was introduced.

Notable members of the Stealth family have been the Diamond Stealth 3D 2000, by far the most popular S3 Virge-based board. The Diamond Stealth32, using the Tseng Labs ET4000/W32p chipset, was capable of impressive price/performance, especially in DOS. The Diamond Stealth64 Graphics 2001, with the ARK 2000PV/MT chipset, was known for excellent DOS performance at the time. The Diamond Stealth II S220, using the Rendition Verite V2100 2D/3D accelerator, was popular with enthusiasts for its excellent price/performance for both 2D and 3D gaming. A special BIOS patch was released by Diamond for the Stealth II S220 which brought its clock speed up to the same level as the high-end Verite V2200 chip, resulting in equal performance at a significantly lower price.

In the middle of the Stealth line-up, Diamond chose to implement a numbering scheme to differentiate their cards. For example, the Diamond Stealth Video VRAM was rechristened the Diamond Stealth Video 3xxx. The numbers had more than a random meaning. Specifically, they tell the buyer the card's memory amount and type. The Stealth Video 3240 uses VRAM (3), is equipped with 2MB initially (2), and is upgradeable to 4MB (4). If the first digit was (2), then the card used standard DRAM.

The numbering scheme confused many people since Diamond just renamed current cards with new names. The Stealth Video 3240 was simply the old Stealth Video VRAM. New cards did also use the scheme, however, such as the S3 Trio64V+ cards.

Partial listing of Stealth-branded models
Diamond Stealth VRAM 	 S3-911/924 	 ISA
Diamond Stealth 24	S3-801/805 	ISA
Diamond Stealth 24 VLB	S3-805 	VLB
Diamond Stealth Pro 	S3-928 	ISA/VLB
Diamond Stealth SE 	S3-Trio32 	VLB/PCI
Diamond Stealth64 Graphics2001 	ARK 2000PV/MT 	PCI
Diamond Stealth32 	Tseng Labs ET4000/W32p 	VLB/PCI
Diamond Stealth64 DRAM 	S3-864/Trio64	VLB/PCI
Diamond Stealth64 Video DRAM 	S3-868 	VLB/PCI
Diamond Stealth64 VRAM 	S3-964 	VLB/PCI
Diamond Stealth64 Video VRAM 	S3-968 	VLB/PCI
Diamond Stealth64 Video 2001	S3-Trio64V+ 	PCI
Diamond Stealth64 Video 2121	S3-Trio64V+ 	PCI
Diamond Stealth64 Video 2201	S3-Trio64V+ 	PCI
Diamond Stealth64 Video 2001 TV	S3-Trio64V+ 	PCI
Diamond Stealth64 Video 2121 TV 	S3-Trio64V+ 	PCI
Diamond Stealth64 Video 2201 TV 	S3-Trio64V+ 	PCI
Diamond Stealth64 Video 2200XL 		VLB/PCI
Diamond Stealth64 Video 2120 	S3-Trio64 	VLB
Diamond Stealth64 Video 2200 	S3-Trio64 	VLB
Diamond Stealth64 Video 2500 	ProMotionAT24 	PCI
Diamond Stealth64 Video 3200 	S3-Vision968 	VLB/PCI
Diamond Stealth64 Video 3240 	S3-Vision968 	VLB/PCI
Diamond Stealth64 Video 3400 	S3-Vision968 	VLB/PCI
Diamond Stealth 3D 2000 S3-ViRGE PCI
Diamond Stealth 3D 2000 Pro S3-ViRGE DX PCI
Diamond Stealth 3D 3000 S3-ViRGE VX PCI
Diamond Stealth 3D 4000 S3-ViRGE GX2 AGP
Diamond Stealth II S220 Rendition Verite V2100 PCI
Diamond Stealth II G460 Intel i740 AGP
Diamond Stealth III S500
Diamond Stealth III S520 S3-Savage4 LT AGP
Diamond Stealth III S530 S3 Savage 4 Pro PCI
Diamond Stealth III S540 S3-Savage4 Pro/Pro+ PCI/AGP
Diamond Stealth III S540 Xtreme S3-Savage4 Xtreme AGP
Diamond Stealth S60 ATI Radeon 7000 AGP
Diamond Stealth Express ATI Radeon X300SE PCI-Express

Edge 3D

The Diamond Edge 3D was the first consumer 3D accelerator card, based on the NVIDIA NV1 chipset. The boards were designed to be an all-encompassing entertainment solution, as the chipset and board included full 2D/3D acceleration, an audio engine capable of General MIDI synthesis, and the ability to use Sega Saturn gamepad controllers.

The architecture of the NV1 predates the Microsoft Direct3D philosophy and, as such, game compatibility was a problem with the Diamond Edge boards. Limited and slow Direct3D-supporting drivers did eventually show up, but performance was inadequate and buggy. The audio engine further received poor reviews regarding MIDI quality, which was a common standard for multimedia music playback at the time.

Listing of Edge 3D-branded boards
Diamond Edge 3D 2xx0 SGS STG2000 (nVidia NV1) PCI
Diamond Edge 3D 3xx0 nVidia NV1 PCI

Monster3D

The Monster3D line was based on 3dfx Voodoo Graphics and Voodoo2 chips which did not contain a 2D engine, requiring a separate VGA card connected externally using a pass-through cable. When the 3D engine was called into use, the 3dfx-based card would disconnect the 2D pass-through signal and begin driving the display directly. Both Voodoo and Voodoo2 based offerings were in production until the STB-3dfx merger. The series was highly successful as the Voodoo Graphics and Voodoo2 chipsets introduced consumer-grade 3D graphics into the PC and arcade markets, whereas such capabilities had previously been present primarily in very high-end CAD and graphic design workstations.

A critically acclaimed feature of the Monster 3D II (and all other Voodoo2 boards) was the capability to connect two identical boards in a SLI (Scan-line Interleave) configuration. In SLI, a pair of Voodoo2 boards splits the effort of rendering the 3D scene between alternating raster lines, allowing performance to be nearly doubled.

Listing of Monster 3D-branded boards
Diamond Monster 3D 3dfx Voodoo1 4MB PCI
Diamond Monster 3D II 3dfx Voodoo2 8MB PCI (4MB video RAM, 4MB texture RAM)
Diamond Monster 3D II 3dfx Voodoo2 12MB PCI (4MB video RAM, 8MB texture RAM)
Diamond Monster 3D II MEGAMonster bundle (Monster 3D II, MEGAMonster Voodoo2 companion board, MEGAMonster (SLI) cable) (a Voodoo2 SLI bundle offered by Diamond)
Diamond Monster Fusion Z100 3dfx Banshee 16MB PCI/AGP (Referred to as the "Mon Fusion" by the sticker on many cards)

Viper

The Viper line was Diamond's high-end offering. Initially it consisted of a graphics accelerator board for VLB or PCI that was a combination of two graphics chips. For non-GUI environments such as DOS, the original Viper used an Oak Technology OTI-087 display chip with its own 256 KB DRAM. This chip was rather slow and basic. The Viper SE card moved to a Weitek 5186 chip with 1 MB DRAM for non-GUI functions. For GUI environments such as Windows, the Viper cards used a Weitek graphics co-processor which accelerated many drawing functions and performed very well for its time. The original Viper used the Weitek P9000/P9001, while the Viper SE used a Weitek P9100, both lines equipped with 2-4 MB VRAM. The separate slow DOS chip was a problem for owners who played DOS games because these chips were quite slow and had limited and buggy VESA BIOS Extensions implementations. While the GUI accelerator was very capable, drivers from Diamond were rather buggy and were only revised a few times during the lifetime of the card.

Towards the end of the 1990s, the Viper line consisted of NVIDIA-based graphics cards. The Diamond Viper V330 used the highly integrated RIVA 128 accelerator that featured very capable 2D, 3D and video acceleration. The later Diamond Viper V550 and V770 utilized the RIVA TNT and RIVA TNT2 accelerators which were evolutions of the RIVA 128.

In 1999, Diamond was acquired by S3 Graphics and became primarily a supplier of products based upon their graphics accelerator chips. The Diamond Viper II Z200 was based upon the S3 Savage 2000, a supposed NVIDIA GeForce 256 killer. Unfortunately the chip itself was not fully functional and the drivers were very buggy.

Partial listing of Viper-branded boards
Diamond Viper Weitek P9000 VLB/PCI (Released 1993)
Diamond Viper SE Weitek P9100 VLB/PCI
Diamond Viper PCI Weitek P9100 PCI
Diamond Viper Pro Video Weitek P9100 VLB/PCI
Diamond Viper V330 nVidia Riva 128 PCI/AGP
Diamond Viper V550 nVidia Riva TNT AGP
Diamond Viper V770 nVidia Riva TNT2 AGP
Diamond Viper II Z200 S3 Savage 2000 AGP
Diamond Viper ATI Radeon X600PRO PCI-Express
Diamond Viper ATI Radeon X1300 PCI-Express
Diamond Viper ATI Radeon X1800 PCI-Express

FireGL
The name "FireGL" stands for Diamond's workstation-class 2D/3D graphics cards. This brand was originally created decades ago as just "Fire" by the design team of the professional computer graphics pioneer SPEA Software AG from Starnberg (Germany) that was acquired by Diamond in 1995.

Products whilst under the hood of Diamond were:

Diamond Fire GL, based on the 3Dlabs GLINT 300SX and S3 Vision968 (for 2D) chips, PCI interface
Diamond Fire GL 1000, based on the 3Dlabs Permedia NT (Permedia + GLINT Delta) chips, PCI interface
Diamond Fire GL 2000, based on the 3Dlabs GLINT 300SX, GLINT Delta and Avance Logic ALG2564 (for 2D) chips, PCI interface
Diamond Fire GL 3000, based on the 3Dlabs GLINT 500TX, GLINT Delta and Avance Logic ALG2564 (for 2D) chips, PCI interface
Diamond Fire GL 4000, based on the Mitsubishi 3DPro/2mp chipset and Cirrus Logic CL-GD5446 (for 2D) chip, PCI interface
Diamond Fire GL 1000 Pro, based on 3Dlabs Permedia2 chip, PCI/AGP interface

The FireGL team was bought by ATI (later AMD) in 2001 once the combined Diamond/S3 dropped out of the graphics market to form SONICblue. ATI continues the Fire GL lineup.

As of September 2007, thus long after that business, Diamond was also preparing a new video card, based on the latest-generation R600 graphics core. This was the same core as used for ATI driven FireGL V8650 and V8600 cards. Diamond altered the PCB reference design and labeled their device VFX 2000 series professional workstation graphics card. It came with at least 2 GB GDDR4 memory on board.

Radeon HD
Radeon HD series.

Partial listing of Radeon HD branded models

Radeon HD 3650 1GB GDDR2 PCI Express 
Radeon HD 4870 X2 
Radeon HD 6770 XOC

Sound cards

Monster Sound

The Diamond Monster Sound gaming sound card series was the first sound card to have its own on-board processor to handle audio operations. The Monster Sound cards were the first to support hardware mixing acceleration with Microsoft's new DirectSound and DirectSound3D audio APIs. Most, if not all, also supported Aureal's burgeoning A3D API.

The original Monster Sound card was distinct in this regard, but also controversial because it possessed poor DOS game compatibility which was still critical at the time. DOS game audio was only functional within a Windows 95 DOS box. It came equipped with a 2MB AdMOS MIDI daughterboard.

The Monster Sound M80 was similar to the original Monster Sound, but lacked 4 speaker support. It also had a reduced quality AdMOS MIDI daughterboard (1MB).

Monster Sound MX200 had excellent General MIDI quality because of the high quality patch set (licensed from Roland) it was equipped with on its 4MB Dream daughtercard. Otherwise it was technically identical to the original Monster Sound.

The Diamond Monster Sound MX300 was based on the Vortex2 audio ASIC from Aureal Semiconductor. It was a substantial step forward in gaming audio, with impressive 3D audio positioning and other effects. It utilized the then state-of-the-art Aureal A3D 2.0 3D audio API.

Monster Sound MX400 was advertised as being one of the first sound cards with hardware MP3 decoding acceleration. This was a redundant feature because the central CPUs in PCs at the time were more than capable of handling MP3 playback. It was also somewhat complicated to make use of the MP3 acceleration because special software was needed to use it.

The Vortex2-equipped MX300 was a superior card for 3D audio. Aureal had gone into bankruptcy and was dissolved, so their last generation of chips were never released. Diamond instead used ESS's less powerful chips to continue the line. The MX400 was the last of the Monster Sound cards.

Diamond Monster Sound PCI
Diamond Monster Sound M80 PCI
Diamond Monster Sound MX100 PCI
Diamond Monster Sound MX200 PCI
Diamond Monster Sound MX300 Aureal Vortex2 PCI
Diamond Monster Sound MX400 ESS Canyon3D PCI

Sonic Impact
The Sonic Impact was the value-oriented sound card line from Diamond. Whereas the MonsterSound lineup was targeted at no-holds-barred gamers, the Sonic Impact cards were more generally aimed, and were cheaper and less powerful. Still the lineup consisted of several capable cards.

Diamond Sonic Impact S70 ESS Maestro2 PCI
Diamond Sonic Impact S90(A/B) Aureal Vortex1 PCI
Diamond Sonic Impact S100 ESS Allegro PCI

XtremeSound
Diamond XtremeSound is the first sound card line launched after the company's restructuring in 2003.

Diamond XtremeSound - 5.1/16 bit Sound Card (XS51) C-Media CMI8738-LX PCI
Diamond XtremeSound - 7.1/24 bit Sound Card (XS71) C-Media CMI8768 PCI
Diamond XtremeSound - 7.1/24 bit Sound Card with Dolby Digital Live (XS71DDL) C-Media CMI8768+ PCI

Other Sound Cards
Diamond Sonic Pro (ISA)
Diamond Mozart (ISA)
Diamond Sonic Sound (ISA)
Diamond Sonic Sound LX (ISA)
Diamond Sonic 3D (ISA)

Other products

TrackSTAR
Diamond's first product (under the corporate name Diamond Computer Systems) was the TrackSTAR, an 8-bit ISA plug-in card for the IBM PC that emulated an Apple II. An early advertisement from 1984 also claimed it would add CP/M compatibility via the included Z80 processor. The TrackSTAR was redesigned to fit in the shorter expansion slot of the Tandy 1000 and was key to that marque's expansion into the educational computer market.

Rio PMP300
Diamond's innovation created the Rio PMP300, one of the first consumer MP3 players, but they soon sold their MP3 player line and no longer provide support for it.

SupraMax DSL modems
The SupraMax line is a popular value DSL modem line. The brand has a lineage going back to Supra, Inc.

Diamond Micronics motherboards
Diamond began manufacturing PC-compatible motherboards after purchasing Micronics Computers Inc. in 1998.

Maximum DVD
Diamond was an early (1997) entrant into PC DVD kits with their Maximum DVD 1000DB-VAR (Value Added Reseller) and 2000-RETKIT (RETail KIT).
These kits bundled a 'feature reduced' (several pin headers and other parts not installed) full length PCI MPEG2 analog overlay decoder card made by division. This card connected to the VGA card with an external passthrough cable, a 3.5mm (1/8") external patch cord to the soundcard's line-in jack, and the analog audio cable from the included Toshiba SD-M1002 DVD-ROM drive connected to the division card while a second cable passed the audio on to the soundcard's internal connector.

Diamond also made kits called the Maximum DVD 1500 and 2500. (Hardware specifications unknown.) The drivers and player software for these are not compatible with the DVD 1000 and 2000. They are a slightly newer product with the 'Navigator' player software having a cleaner user interface.

None of these DVD kits are DirectX compatible and as the drivers are the VxD type, they will only work with Windows 95 through 98SE. Dual-layer DVDs are not supported in original Windows 95 or 95a, but are in the various versions of 95 OEM Service Release 2. Windows 98 or 98SE is not recommended due to problems that may happen with video color and alignment. Only the bundled player software can use the hardware MPEG2 decoding of the card.

SCSI adapters
Diamond produced the capable but relatively low-cost FirePort 40 SCSI adapter in the late 1990s.

References

 "BEST DATA PRODUCTS COMPLETES ACQUISITION OF DIAMOND MULTIMEDIA BRANDS AND ASSETS " by Best Data Products Inc., October 28, 2003, retrieved December 23, 2005
"PC Video Chipset Information" by Michael Scott & Harm Hanemaayer, February 19, 1997, retrieved December 23, 2005
"Wave Issue 9825 5/13/98 Article 1-01" by 4th Wave Inc., May 13, 1998, retrieved January 13, 2005

External links

MP3 Player History Pt2
More Diamond Sound Card Images at HardwareHistory Museum
More Diamond Video Card Images at HardwareHistory Museum
Diamond Xtreme Sound 7.1 review

Portable audio player manufacturers
Electronics companies of the United States
Manufacturing companies based in California
Companies based in Los Angeles
Graphics hardware companies